Igor Dmitrievich Serebryakov (Игорь Дмитриевич Серебряков; 27 November 1917 – 1998) was a Soviet lexicographer and translator. He along with Igor Rabinovich made the first Punjabi-Russian Dictionary.

Books
 Sketches of Ancient Indian Literature 
Punjabi Literature : A Brief Outline

References

1917 births
1998 deaths
Lexicographers
Soviet translators